Rodrigo Masias (born March 11, 1981), is a Peruvian professional basketball player.  He currently plays for the Regatas Lima club of the Liga de Basket de Lima.

He represented Peru's national basketball team at the 2016 South American Basketball Championship, where he was his team's best shot blocker.

References

External links
 FIBA profile at 2016 South American Championship
 FIBA.com profile
 Latinbasket.com Profile

1981 births
Living people
Peruvian men's basketball players
Centers (basketball)
Sportspeople from Lima
20th-century Peruvian people
21st-century Peruvian people